Kerry–Limerick West was a parliamentary constituency represented in Dáil Éireann, the lower house of the Irish parliament or Oireachtas from 1921 to 1923. The constituency elected 8 deputies (Teachtaí Dála, commonly known as TDs) to the Dáil, on the system of proportional representation by means of the single transferable vote (PR-STV).

History
The constituency was created under the Government of Ireland Act 1920 to elect members to the House of Commons of Southern Ireland and first used at the 1921 general election to return the members of the 2nd Dáil. It succeeded four United Kingdom House of Commons constituencies in Kerry and the constituency of West Limerick which in 1918 were used to elect the members of the 1st Dáil.

It was abolished under the Electoral Act 1923 and succeeded by the new Kerry constituency and the Limerick constituency, both of which were first used at the 1923 general election for the members of the 4th Dáil.

Both elections held in this constituency were uncontested.

Boundaries
The constituency covered all of County Kerry and the western parts of County Limerick.

TDs

Elections

1922 general election

1921 general election

|}

See also
Dáil constituencies
Politics of the Republic of Ireland
Historic Dáil constituencies
Elections in the Republic of Ireland

References

External links
Oireachtas Members Database

Historic constituencies in County Kerry
Historic constituencies in County Limerick
Dáil constituencies in the Republic of Ireland (historic)
1921 establishments in Ireland
1923 disestablishments in Ireland
Constituencies established in 1921
Constituencies disestablished in 1923